The year 1999 is the 7th year in the history of the Ultimate Fighting Championship (UFC), a mixed martial arts promotion based in the United States. In 1999 the UFC held 6 events beginning with, UFC 18: The Road to the Heavyweight Title.

Title fights

Debut UFC fighters

The following fighters fought their first UFC fight in 1999:

Alfonso Alcarez
Bas Rutten
Chris Condo
Daiju Takase
Darrel Gholar
Dave Roberts
David Dodd
Eugene Jackson
Evan Tanner
Fabiano Iha
Frank Caracci

Jason Godsey
Jens Pulver
Joe Slick
Joey Roberts
John Lewis
Jorge Patino
Katsuhisa Fujii
Keiichiro Yamamiya
Kenichi Yamamoto
Kevin Randleman
Lowell Anderson

Marcelo Mello
Masutatsu Yano
Matt Hughes
Paul Jones
Ron Waterman
Sione Latu
Steve Judson
Tim Lajcik
Tony Petarra
Travis Fulton
Valeri Ignatov

Events list

See also
 UFC
 List of UFC champions
 List of UFC events

References

Ultimate Fighting Championship by year
1999 in mixed martial arts